"Thief" is a single by German synthpop group Camouflage. The single was released on July 12, 1999 via Virgin Records label. The single was later re-recorded and included on their sixth studio album Sensor in 2003.

Overview
The record was the first single to feature band member Oliver Kreyssig since he departed the band in 1990. It was also the band's first single in three years.

According to an interview with the band in 2008, they originally recorded the song in a very modern style. This version was rejected by their label, who pushed them to instead produce it so it sounded more like their early work. The "Opal Mix" on the single appears to be the originally recorded version.

Music video
The music video for "Thief" featured a woman caught up in some sort of love triangle with the three band members. It was directed by Marcus Sternberg.

Track listings

CD single (Germany, 1999)
 "Thief" (single mix) - 3:19
 "Isolation" - 5:45
 "Thief" (Opal mix) - 3:31
 "Thief" (Der Dritte Raum mix) - 5:56
 "Thief" (Oh. Remix) - 4:18

CD Promo (Germany, 1999)
 "Thief" (Layout mix) - 3:18
 "Thief" (Layout instrumental) - 3:17

References

1999 singles
Camouflage (band) songs
1999 songs
Virgin Records singles
Songs written by Heiko Maile